Quest (Marathi title: Thang) is a 2006 bilingual English and Marathi Indian drama film directed by Amol Palekar, starring Mukta Barve, Rishi Deshpande, Mrinal Kulkarni in lead roles. The film is last part of the trilogy on sexuality, which includes  Daayraa (The Square Circle, 1996) and Anahat (Eternity, 2001). It is an urban story of a woman who discovers that her husband is homosexual. It was premiered at the Brisbane International Film Festival (BIFF) on 5 August 2006.

This is first English language film made by Palekar. Both the version in Marathi and English were shot simultaneously, and the shooting was completed in 25 days.

At the 54th National Film Awards, it won the National Film Award for Best Feature Film in English.

Cast
 Mukta Barve 
 Rishi Deshpande as Aditya
 Mrinal Kulkarni 
 Vijaya Mehta 
 Shishir Sharma
 Sachin Khedekar

References

External links

 

English-language Indian films
2006 films
2006 drama films
2000s Marathi-language films
Films directed by Amol Palekar
Best English Feature Film National Film Award winners
Films scored by Anand Modak